Max Joseph (born January 16, 1982) is an American filmmaker and a television and gameshow host.

For seven seasons, he was a host and cameraman for Catfish: The TV Show. He was absent from Catfish for several episodes in the fourth season to make his feature film debut, We Are Your Friends, starring Zac Efron. Joseph announced that he was leaving Catfish: The TV Show in 2018, and he was replaced in 2020 by Kamie Crawford.

Joseph has directed several films, including 12 Years of DFA: Too Old to Be New, Too New to Be Classic, Garden of Eden, '', and several other productions.

Filmography

Awards and nominations

References

External links 
Official website

1982 births
Living people
American male screenwriters
Jewish American screenwriters
Film directors from New York City
Screenwriters from New York (state)
21st-century American Jews